The FV107 Scimitar is an armoured tracked military reconnaissance vehicle (sometimes classed as a light tank) used by the British Army. It was manufactured by Alvis in Coventry. It is very similar to the FV101 Scorpion, but mounts a high-velocity 30 mm L21 RARDEN cannon instead of a 76 mm gun. It was issued to Royal Armoured Corps armoured regiments in the reconnaissance role. Each regiment originally had a close reconnaissance squadron of five troops, each containing eight FV107 Scimitars. Each Main Battle Tank Regiment also employed eight Scimitars in the close reconnaissance role.

Development
The FV107 Scimitar is one of the CVR(T) series of vehicles. It entered service in 1971.

Initially, the engine was the Jaguar J60 4.2-litre 6-cylinder petrol engine, the same as used by several Jaguar cars. This was replaced by a Cummins BTA 5.9 diesel engine in British Army Scimitars under the CVR(T) Life Extension Program (LEP).

The UK initiated the Tactical Reconnaissance Armoured Combat Equipment Requirement (TRACER) to replace the Sabre and Scimitar. In 1996 the U.S. joined in on the project. In 2001, both the UK and U.S. dropped out of the joint program.

Scimitar Mk II 
Following a risk mitigation programme, in December 2010 a contract was awarded for the development, testing and management of an upgraded Scimitar. This was undertaken by the Vehicles Military & Technical Services team, BAE Systems Telford, which co-ordinated the build of 50 vehicles at the nearby DSG (Defence Support Group), Donnington, to be completed in early 2012. The Scimitar Mark 2 combat vehicle is one of five enhanced CVR(T) types. It was created in early 2010, and continues in service.

The Scimitar Mk II was:
 Rehulled to give better mine-blast protection for troops
 Improved armour fitted to enhance resistance to blasts and ballistic threats
 Provide mine-protected (suspended and piston-mounted) seating in every crew position
 Improve available space and improve crew conditions
 Mitigate repairs while reducing maintenance and life-cycle costs, and extend in-service life.
The resulting vehicles have since been re-engined with a Cummins BTA 5.9 litre diesel engine and David Brown TN15E+ automatic gearbox. In addition to providing power for an air conditioning system, the new more fuel-efficient engine extends the vehicle's operational range, while the re-designed internal layout allows better-protected fuel tanks to be repositioned for reduced vulnerability to blast and ballistic threats.

The new engine and transmission package promised straightforward servicing and support for the Mk II during its in-service life, refurbished dampers simultaneously improving crew comfort - and hence reducing fatigue - while extending the life of vehicle components and maintaining the tactical mobility of the original vehicle despite an increase to an operation weight of c12,000 kg.

BAE Systems have proposed improved road wheels, new conventional metal tracks with guaranteed mileage (which could reduce the vehicle's running costs) and continuous 'rubber' band tracks, which significantly decrease both vibration and noise, allowing crew to operate more effectively and for longer, even in the harshest environments, while reducing the vehicle's acoustic signature.

Additional specifications
 Ground clearance: 0.35 m
 Main armament: 30 mm L21 RARDEN cannon. (Fires at up to 90 rounds per minute)
 Ammunition types:
 High Explosive Incendiary (HEI)
 High Explosive (HE)
 Armour Piercing (AP)
 APSE (Armour Piercing Secondary Effects)
 Armour Piercing Discarding Sabot-Tracer (APDS-T)
 Additional defence: 2 × 4-barrel smoke launchers.
 Ammunition stores:
 30 mm – 165 rounds
 7.62 mm – 2,000 rounds
 As with all UK armoured vehicles, Scimitar is equipped with a forced air system, so the crew can lock down in a CBRN environment. For this reason, the vehicle is equipped with a boiling vessel (or "BV"), to cook and make hot drinks.

Operators

Current operators

  – 325 units
The Scimitar is used by the three formation reconnaissance regiments of the British Army.

After the Strategic Defence and Security Review in 2010, some regiments are seeing their Challenger 2 tanks replaced with CVR(T) Scimitars.

As of March 2020, the out-of-service date of the Scimitar is expected to be 2023.

  – 123 units
In September 2014, Latvia signed a contract with Great Britain for the purchase of 123 armoured combat vehicles as part of the Latvian National Armed Forces infantry brigade mechanization program.

Former operators
  Belgium – 153 units, withdrawn from active service in 2004.

Combat use
Two troops from B Squadron, Blues and Royals served in the Falklands War. One troop was equipped with four Scorpions, the other with four Scimitars. These CVR(T)s were the only armoured vehicles used in action by the British Army during the conflict. At least one Scimitar was seriously damaged by an Argentinian landmine, but the crew were unscathed, and the vehicle was salvaged by a Chinook HC.1 helicopter and soon brought back into service by the attached REME section. Scorpions and Scimitars also provided air defence support with machine guns and 30 mm guns; on 23 May 1982, a Scimitar claimed a 30 mm hit on a Skyhawk at 1,000 m.

First Gulf War, 1st The Queen's Dragoon Guards, with attached reinforcements, fought as a regiment during this war and was equipped with Scimitar. A troop of Scimitars engaged and knocked out Iraqi T-62s, penetrating their frontal armour with sabot rounds. One Scimitar was engaged and hit by an Iraqi T-55 and the penetrating round passed through the thin aluminium armour without injuring the crew.

Scimitars of C Squadron were used in the Battle of Al Faw in the opening days of the 2003 Invasion of Iraq. Plans for an amphibious landing by Scimitars were abandoned due to extensive mining of the beaches; instead, they crossed into Iraq by land.

In Afghanistan, during Operation Herrick, Scimitars were deployed either in standard troop organisations or as part of Jackal composite troops, in which role they provided additional firepower to complement the Jackal's high mobility.

See also
 CVR(T) (Combat Vehicle Reconnaissance – Tracked) family of vehicles.
 M3 Bradley Cavalry Fighting Vehicle - similar role

References

Further reading

 ArmyRecognition Scimitar pictures
 FV107 Scimitar
 Scimitar MkII
 DESider Magazine (Defence Equipment and Support) MOD Issue 41 October 2011

Reconnaissance vehicles of the Cold War
Reconnaissance vehicles of the post–Cold War period
Reconnaissance vehicles of the United Kingdom
Military vehicles introduced in the 1970s
Tracked reconnaissance vehicles
Alvis vehicles